The FIBA Saporta Cup Finals Top Scorer was the individual award for the player that was the highest points scorer of the FIBA Saporta Cup Finals. Which was the championship Finals of the European-wide second-tier level professional club basketball competition, the FIBA Saporta Cup.

FIBA Saporta Cup Finals Top Scorers
From the 1966–67 season, to the 2001–02 season, the Top Scorer of the FIBA Saporta Cup Finals was noted, regardless of whether he played on the winning or losing team.

Multiple FIBA Saporta Cup Finals Top Scorers

Top 10 scoring performances in finals games
The 10 highest individual single-game scoring performances in FIBA Saporta Cup Finals games.

See also
EuroLeague Finals Top Scorer (1st tier level)
FIBA Saporta Cup
FIBA Saporta Cup Finals
FIBA Saporta Cup Finals MVP
FIBA Saporta Cup Top Scorer
FIBA Saporta Cup Records
FIBA Festivals
FIBA EuroStars

References

External links
FIBA Saporta Cup @ FIBA Europe.com
FIBA Saporta Cup Winners
FIBA Saporta Cup @ LinguaSport.com

Finals top scorers
European basketball awards